John Milton (1608–1674) was a famous English poet.
John Milton may also refer to:

People
John Milton (composer) (1563–1647), English composer, father of the poet
John Milton (Florida politician) (1807–1865), Governor of Florida and relative of the poet
John Milton (Georgia politician) (c. 1740–1804), Georgia Secretary of State and grandfather of the Florida Governor
John Gerald Milton (1881–1977), United States Senator from New Jersey
John P. Milton, 20th-century meditation instructor
John R. Milton (1924–1995), University of South Dakota English Professor and South Dakota Review founder 
John Watson Milton, American politician and writer
John William Milton (1948–1995), American wrestler better known by his ringname of Big John Studd
John Milton Elliott (1820–1879), United States politician and lawyer
John Milton Niles (1787–1856), United States editor and political figure
John Milton Oakes (1440s–1480s), English businessman
John Griffith Milton (1885–1915), England rugby international, played as Jumbo Milton
Milton Johns (1938-), British actor, born as John Milton

Fictional
 John Milton, a character played by Al Pacino in the 1997 film The Devil's Advocate.
 John Milton, a character played by Lance Henriksen in the 2000 film Scream 3.
 John 'Spud' Milton, the protagonist in John Howard van de Ruit's Spud series of novels.

Other
John Milton (ship), the fatal 1858 shipwreck off Long Island

Milton, John